Lotus leaf bread is a Chinese steamed bread that is semi-circular and flat in form, with a horizontal fold that, when opened, gives the appearance that it has been sliced. It is a traditional accompaniment to dishes such as fen zheng rou or roast duck. The bland white dough acts as a counterfoil to the intense flavors and textures of rich, meaty dishes such as a slow-cooked pork belly. Lines or patterns may be added to make it resemble a lotus leaf more. When the bread is stuffed, it is referred to as a lotus leaf bun. Lotus leaf bread is most well known outside of China as the bread that is used in the Fujianese dish gua bao.

References 

Chinese breads